Utting is a census-designated place in La Paz County, Arizona, United States. As of the 2010 census, its population was 126. The community was named after Charles Utting, who fought with the Rough Riders in the Spanish–American War.

Demographics

References

Census-designated places in La Paz County, Arizona